The National Democratic Alternative (ADN), originally the Democratic Republican Party (PDR) until October 2021, is a  Portuguese political party, founded in 2014. It was founded in Coimbra on 5 October 2014 and was legalised by the Portuguese Constitutional Court on 11 February 2015. It was created by António Marinho e Pinto, an MEP formerly for the Earth Party. It was a member of the European Democratic Party, and sat within the Alliance of Liberals and Democrats for Europe Group in the European Parliament.

In the 2015 legislative elections it did not succeed in electing a member of parliament, receiving 60,912 votes or 1.1% and coming 7th.

In 2022 the party attracted some attention for its denialist position on the Covid-19 pandemic after the party president claimed on a televised debate that "there wasn't an excess of mortality in Portugal because of Covid", and that "there is proof that only 152 people died of Covid (in Portugal)".

On september 22nd 2022 the party would leave the European Democratic Party due to ideological divergencies regarding the LGBT community.

Electoral results

Assembly of the Republic

References

2014 establishments in Portugal
Centrist parties in Portugal
Conservative parties in Portugal
European Democratic Party
Eurosceptic parties in Portugal
Liberal parties in Portugal
Political parties established in 2014
Populist parties
Social liberal parties